Lawrence Cleminson is a Zimbabwean rugby union player who plays at prop.

He was born in Bulawayo where he played U13 rugby for Matabeleland Duikers.

In 2015 he was invited by Yenisey-STM to play for the club during its 2015-16 European Rugby Challenge Cup campaign and played in the away match v Newcastle Falcons, however he could not play more matches in that tournament because of visa issues.

He played more than 20 matches for Zimbabwe national team.

References

External links
 Itsrugby profile
 EPCR profile
 rugby.blazermag.com profile

1992 births
Living people
Zimbabwean rugby union players
Rugby union props